Baghtos Kay Mujra Kar  is a 2017 Indian Marathi-language political comedy-drama film which is directed by Hemant Dhome. It stars Jitendra Joshi, Aniket Vishwasrao and Akshay Tanksale in lead roles. The film was released on 3 February 2017.

Plot

Settled at the foothills of a fort is a quaint village 'Kharbujewaadi'. This village is a land of many a 'Mavla' who served Shivaji Maharaj with great valour. The courage, grit and sacrifice that this village had to offer, played a major role in King Shivaji's fight for 'Hindavi Swarajya'.

But ... those were the days. Today, Kharbujewadi is a much developed modern town. Their eternal loyalty to the Maratha king Shivaji, forever on exhibit, the village is strewn with shops named: Shivaji Vada Pav Centre, Jijamata Saree Corner, Sambhaji Pan Shop, Tanaji Medicals etc. Unfortunately, their love for their beloved king is limited to the signboards, slogans on the cars and saffron coloured tilak on the foreheads.

The most important symbol of the Hindavi Swarajya, the forts of Shivaji are long forgotten. The once majestic fort overlooking this buzzing town lays in ruins, tainted with tobacco laden spit, garbage, empty beer bottles and lovers declaring their love for each other on the same walls where the brave mawlas spilt their blood for Swarajya.

What is this outrageous plan? Is it going to work? Will their dream to restore this fort become a reality?

Cast
 Jitendra Joshi as Nanasaheb Deshmukh
 Aniket Vishwasrao as Pandurang Shinde
 Akshay Tanksale as Shivraj Vahadne
 Hemant Dhome as Samsher Patil
 Parna Pethe as Shivraj's wife
 Rasika Sunil as Pandurang's wife
 Neha Joshi
 Ashwini Kalsekar
 Vikram Gokhale
 Rohit Haldikar as Wanted
 Sonalee Kulkarni as Gauri Bhosale (special appearance)

Release
Baghtos Kay Mujra Kar set to release on 3 February 2017 with English subtitles in Maharashtra, Gujarat, Goa, Madhya Pradesh, Delhi, Karnataka, Andhra Pradesh and Telangana.

Publicity
The trailer of the film is revealed on 5 January 2017 on Sinhagad Fort. This was the first instance when a trailer launch was held on a fort.

Soundtrack

The songs for the film are composed by Amitraj and written by Kshitij Patwardhan.

References

External links 
 

2017 films
Indian drama films
2010s Marathi-language films
2017 drama films